Sir Morris Finer QC (12 December 1917 – 14 December 1974) was a British lawyer and judge.

Early life
Finer was born in Bethnal Green in London, the son of Charles Finer, a master tailor, and his wife Ray (née Topper). He was educated at Kilburn Grammar School and the London School of Economics, where he read law. 

He was rejected for military service during the Second World War on account of his poor eyesight, instead serving as an assistant principal in the Ministry of Health. His younger brother was the journalist Leslie Finer.

Career

Finer was called by Gray's Inn to the Bar in 1943, but due to the inadequacy of his earnings he also wrote leaders for the London Evening Standard. He became a Queen's Counsel in 1963 and was elected a Master of the Bench of Gray's Inn in 1971, before being made a judge the following year (1972). He received the customary knighthood on 1 March 1973.

Finer was noted for his involvement in many campaigns for social reform. In 1967, he chaired a committee on behalf of the Society for Labour Lawyers – which included Anthony Lester, Sir Geoffrey Bindman and Michael Zander – that considered improving the accessibility of the justice system by introducing a network of American-style neighbourhood law centres, staffed by trained lawyers; the resulting report was published as Justice For All in 1968. Furthermore, under Finer's chairmanship the Finer Report on One Parent Families was published in the early 1970s, and he was subsequently appointed chairman of the Royal Commission on the Press. Before it was completed, Sir Morris died of lung cancer, two days after his 57th birthday.

As a commercial lawyer, Finer was involved in several prominent cases, including acting for three of the Beatles – John Lennon, George Harrison, Ringo Starr – and Apple Corps Ltd over the management of the band in 1971.

Other activities

Finer was chairman of the Cinematograph Films Council and a governor and, later, vice chairman of the board of governors of the London School of Economics. After his death a Morris Finer Memorial Scholarship was established at the LSE in his honour.

Miscellaneous
Additional information about Finer appears in the Oxford Dictionary of National Biography. A painting of him by his cousin, Stephen Finer, is in the collection of Pallant House Gallery, Chichester, Sussex.

Publications
 
 Company Law  (1948)
 Justice For All (1968) Society of Labour Lawyers

Notes

References
  Oxford Dictionary of National Biography

Further reading
 Sinners? Scroungers? Saints?

External links
 Catalogue of the Royal Commission on the Press papers at LSE Archives
 Catalogue of the Committee on One Parent Families papers at LSE Archives
  Morris Finer Memorial Scholarships

20th-century English judges
English Jews
People associated with the London School of Economics
People educated at Kilburn Grammar School
1917 births
1974 deaths
Governors of the London School of Economics
Knights Bachelor
Deaths from lung cancer
Deaths from cancer in England